Pirinsko Pivo is a  brewery founded in 1969 in Blagoevgrad in SW Bulgaria.

Details 
Pirinsko is named after the nearby Pirin Mountains and is situated in Blagoevgrad, a city located 90 km south of the capital Sofia. The brewery substantially expanded in the last few years and has a market share of 12 percent today. The brewery produces filtered and carbonated lagers.

Beer 
The main brand is Pirinsko, a standard lager which has an 8% share of the national market.

Availability 
The beers are available in Bulgaria.

External links 
RateBeer

Breweries in Bulgaria
Blagoevgrad